The 2021 World Judo Championships were held from 6 to 13 June 2021 in Budapest, Hungary.

Schedule
All times are local (UTC+2).

The event will air freely on the IJF YouTube channel.

Russia doping ban
On 9 December 2019, the World Anti-Doping Agency (WADA) banned Russia from all international sport for a period of four years, after the Russian government was found to have tampered with laboratory data that it provided to WADA in January 2019 as a condition of the Russian Anti-Doping Agency being reinstated. As a result of the ban, WADA plans to allow individually cleared Russian athletes to take part in the 2021-2022 World Championships and 2022 Winter Olympics under a neutral banner, as instigated at the 2018 Winter Olympics, but they will not be permitted to compete in team sports. The title of the neutral banner has yet to be determined; WADA Compliance Review Committee head Jonathan Taylor stated that the IOC would not be able to use "Olympic Athletes from Russia" (OAR) as it did in 2018, emphasizing that neutral athletes cannot be portrayed as representing a specific country. Russia later filed an appeal to the Court of Arbitration for Sport (CAS) against the WADA decision. The Court of Arbitration for Sport, on review of Russia's appeal of its case from WADA, ruled on December 17, 2020 to reduce the penalty that WADA had placed. Instead of banning Russia from sporting events, the ruling allowed Russia to participate at the Olympics and other international events, but for a period of two years, the team cannot use the Russian name, flag, or anthem and must present themselves as "Neutral Athlete" or "Neutral Team". The ruling does allow for team uniforms to display "Russia" on the uniform as well as the use of the Russian flag colors within the uniform's design, although the name should be up to equal predominance as the "Neutral Athlete/Team" designation.

Medal summary

Medal table

Men's events

Women's events

Mixed events

Prize money
The sums written are per medalist, bringing the total prizes awarded to 798,000€ for the individual events and 200,000€ for the team event.

References

External links
 

World Judo Championships
 
World Championships
World Championships
Judo
World 2021
Judo World Championships
Judo World Championships
Judo World Championships